Wabaunsee USD 329 is a public unified school district headquartered in Alma, Kansas, United States. The district includes the communities of Alma, Maple Hill, McFarland, Newbury, Paxico, Volland, and nearby rural areas.

Schools
The school district operates the following schools:
 Wabaunsee High School
 Wabaunsee Junior High
 Paxico Middle School
 Alma Elementary School
 Maple Hill Elementary School

Sports
Sports in the middle and junior high include volleyball, wrestling, cross country, girls basketball, boys basketball, and track & field. Sports in the high school include cross country, football, tennis, volleyball, wrestling, cheerleading, baseball, softball and track & field.

History
In 2016, Mill Creek Valley USD 329 was renamed to Wabaunsee USD 329.

See also
 Kansas State Department of Education
 Kansas State High School Activities Association
 List of high schools in Kansas
 List of unified school districts in Kansas

External links

External links
 

 School districts in Kansas
Education in Wabaunsee County, Kansas